The Surjit Hockey Stadium, also sometimes referred to as Surjeet Hockey Stadium, is a field hockey stadium in Jalandhar, Punjab, India. It is named after Jalandhar-born Olympian Surjit Singh. This stadium is home of the franchise Sher-e-Punjab of the World Series Hockey and Punjab Warriors of Hockey India League. It is established by the members of the Surjit Hockey Society.

References

Field hockey venues in India
Sports venues in Punjab, India
Sport in Jalandhar
Field hockey in Punjab, India

Sports venues in Jalandhar
Year of establishment missing